Charaxes margaretae is a butterfly in the family Nymphalidae. It is found in southern Malawi, south-western Tanzania and possibly eastern Zambia. 

The habitat consists of montane forests.

The larvae feed on Albizia gummifera, Agelaea heterophylla and Dalbergia lactea.

Taxonomy
Virtually indistinguishable from Charaxes congdoni in the adult facies but the genitalia differ.

References

External links
Charaxes margaratae images at Consortium for the Barcode of Life

Butterflies described in 1980
margaretae